The Iliza Shlesinger Sketch Show is an American sketch comedy streaming television series created by and starring Iliza Shlesinger. The series premiered on Netflix on April 1, 2020.

Episodes

Reception
The show received mixed reviews. In a mostly positive take for RogerEbert.com, Brian Tallerico wrote of the first season, "Overall, it's a bit of a mixed-bag—so much sketch comedy is, especially in the first season—with some sketches going on way past their breaking point, but there's an unabashed willingness to be ridiculous that marks the best moments in this six-episode run. When Shlesinger latches onto a concept she finds funny, she refuses to let go until she's drained after last morsel of its potential, and her brazen energy can be infectious. […] Iliza Shlesinger may have a show named after her, but it still feels like she’s just getting warmed up." Steve Bennett, writing for Chortle, was more critical: "The lasting impression of this show [...] is of an undercooked brain dump, with Shlesinger's stream of manic ideas needing more editing and focus, even if some of the individual scenes – normally those with one foot in reality – offer laughs and a wry social comment."

References

External links
 
 

English-language Netflix original programming
2020s American sketch comedy television series
2020 American television series debuts
2020 American television series endings